Robbie Bosco (born January 11, 1963) is a former American football quarterback who played college football at Brigham Young University (BYU) and helped lead the team to the 1984 National Championship.  He is a native of Roseville, California.

College career
In 1984, Bosco took over as starting quarterback at BYU after the graduation of Steve Young.  In his first season as a starter, Bosco guided the Cougars to a perfect 13–0 record. BYU finished the season by defeating Michigan, 24–17, in the Holiday Bowl, clinching the school's first and only national championship. Despite injuries to his knee, ankle, and rib, he led the Cougars back from a 17–10 fourth quarter deficit. His 13-yard touchdown pass to Kelly Smith with 1:23 left in the game secured the victory.

Bosco completed 283 of 458 passes for 3,875 yards and 33 touchdowns during the 1984 regular season. He led the nation in passing yardage, and finished second, behind Doug Flutie of Boston College, in pass efficiency. He finished third in the voting for the Heisman Trophy.

In Bosco's senior season (1985), BYU finished with an 11–3 record. He completed 338 of 511 passes for 4,273 yards (the second-highest total in BYU history at the time, behind Jim McMahon's 4,571 yards in 1980), throwing 30 touchdown passes that year. Against New Mexico, Bosco set a school single-game record by passing for 585 yards.  He finished his BYU career with 10 NCAA records, and was third in voting for the 1985 Heisman Trophy.

Bosco received a BA in communications and he received a master's degree in exercise science, both from BYU, and has worked in various coaching and administrative positions at BYU since 1989.

Collegiate statistics

Source:

Professional career
Bosco was drafted in the third round of the 1986 NFL Draft by the Green Bay Packers, where he played for two years until a shoulder injury ended his career. Bosco was hired as BYU's QB coach from 1990-2003.

Personal life
Bosco and his wife Karen have six children:  Amber, Karissa, Alexis, Dallin, Wesley, and Collin.

See also
 List of NCAA major college football yearly passing leaders
 List of NCAA major college football yearly total offense leaders

References

External links
 

1963 births
Living people
American football quarterbacks
BYU Cougars football coaches
BYU Cougars football players
Green Bay Packers players
Sportspeople from Roseville, California
Players of American football from California
Latter Day Saints from California
Brigham Young University alumni